The following ships have used the name SS Pere Marquette;

  (1896), the world's first steel train ferry
 , a Great Lakes train ferry built in 1902
  (1943), a Liberty ship built in 1943 for World War II, scrapped in 1971

Ship names